The Desh Vibhag Lekh is an Indian document written by Swaminarayan in 1827 establishing the division of the Swaminarayan Sampradaya into two dioceses by territory of Ahmedabad and Vadtal. This document is highly regarded by the two diocese as it establishes Acharyas as the successors to Swaminarayan.  Groups that regard sadhus over acharyas downplay the importance of the Lekh as an administrative document. 

It was dictated by Sahajanand Swami himself and written by Sadhu Shukmuni in the Darbar of Khachar Dada Ebhal at Gadhada in the year 1826. It was translated into English by Geo. P Taylor in 1903. It has been accepted as such by the Bombay High Court as valid document.

Purpose

The Lekh has 30 articles, which give the following directions:

 Demarcation of the jurisdiction and responsibilities of the two Gadis (NarNarayan Dev Gadi and LaxmiNarayan Dev Gadi). The Narnarayan Dev gadi controls the Uttar Desh and Laxminarayan Dev gadi the Dakshin Desh. The demarkation is that the Uttar Desh territory runs from Bhuj to Calcutta and above and the Dakshin Desh territory runs below this line as per this Lekh.
 Duties and responsibilities of Acharyas and means of appointing future Acharyas.
 Directions of what to do with the incomes of the temples
 Appointment of Sadhus and how they should remain under the commands of the Acharyas faithfully.
 Instruction for Satsangi's
The Lekh outlines that only the acting Acharya can appoint the next Acharya for the Gadi.
Only the Acharya can give guru-mantra or diksha and initiate new satsangi's or priests/santos.

Use
This document has been produced in the Indian Courts of Justice, time and again when individuals have challenged the Acharyas’ rightful place as Spiritual Leaders and Trustees of Swaminarayan’s Sampraday and all its assets. Some organisations have been instructed by the Indian judiciary to remove the word Swaminarayan from their name, because they cannot justify their philosophies to be the same as Sahajanand Swami’s.

To further protect Swaminarayan’s Sampraday, the Indian courts of justice have devised management schemes, appointing the Acharyas as Trustees of their respective Gadi, further recognising the position of the Acharyas, as bona fide successors to Sahajanand Swami.

The BAPS sect, founded in 1905 after separating from the Vadtal diocese, does not accept this document in literal interpretation yet does not rejects its validity. The BAPS founders too at one point served the original diocese according to Lekh.  BAPS does acknowledge that Swaminarayan "for administrative purpose, He divided His mandirs into two regions and appointed his two adopted sons, the Acharyas, Raghuvirji Maharaj and Ayodhyaprasadji Maharaj to guide the progress." But BAPS maintains that Gunatitanand Swami was the sole successor.

Notes

References
 Appeal no.165 of 1940 in the court of the district judge, Kaira, at Nadiad from decree in reg. civil suit no. 519 of 1936 of the court of the sub-judge Mr. P. B. Patel of Borsad.

Swaminarayan Sampradaya